Kızılen  is a village in Erdemli district of Mersin Province, Turkey. At   it is situated in a valley of a dry river bed. The population of the village was 279   as of 2012. There are traces of ancient civilizations around the village. But the village was founded by a Turkmen tribe from Taşkale of Karaman Province. In the early years of the Turkish Republic Kızılen was a neighbourhood of Küstülü, another village to the south east. But in 1961 it gained its legal status a s a village. Main economic activity is agriculture. Tomato, cucumber, bean as well as fruits like apple, peach and cherry are among the crops.

References

Villages in Erdemli District